The Society of the Divine Word, abbreviated SVD and popularly called the Verbites or the Divine Word Missionaries, and sometimes the Steyler Missionaries, is a Catholic clerical religious congregation of Pontifical Right for men. As of 2020, it consisted of 5,965 members composed of  priests and religious brothers working in more than 70 countries, now part of VITA international. It is one of the largest missionary congregations in the Catholic Church. Its members add the nominal letters SVD after their names to indicate membership in the Congregation. The superior general is Paulus Budi Kleden who hails from Indonesia.

History

The Society was founded in Steyl in the Netherlands in 1875 by Arnold Janssen,  a diocesan priest, and drawn mostly from German priests and religious exiles in the Netherlands during the church-state conflict called the Kulturkampf, which had resulted in many religious groups being expelled and  seminaries being closed in Germany.

In 1882, the Society started sending missionaries into China’s Shandong Province, where their aggressive methods were part of the chain of events that led to the Boxer Uprising in the late 1890s. In 1892, missionaries were sent to Togo, a small country in west Africa. The Togo mission was particularly fruitful, for 15 years later the Holy See had appointed an Apostolic prefect. The Society’s third mission was to German New Guinea, (the northern half of present-day Papua New Guinea). A mission was also opened in Paraguay.

In the 20th century the Society further expanded, opening communities in Australia, Botswana (Gaborone, Gumare and Ghanzi); Brazil; Canada (Quebec and Ontario); Indonesia; South Africa (Phalaborwa, Polokwane and Pretoria); the United States of America (Appalachia  and Illinois); and Zambia (Kabwe, Livingstone, and Lusaka). Additional European communities were established in Austria (Bischofshofen near Salzburg and Vienna); the Netherlands (Tegelen); Rome; the United Kingdom and in the Silesian area in Poland (where  Fr. Mirosław Piątkowski invented in 1994 a new devotion, the Chaplet of the Holy Spirit and His Seven Gifts).

Present day
Many religious orders and congregations have certain characteristics or traits that make them known. The Divine Word Missionaries are recognised by what are called the four characteristic dimensions: the Bible, Mission Animation, Communication, Justice and Peace and Integrity of Creation (JPIC). With regards to the missions, what makes the SVD unique from many missionary institutes is that mission areas or regions are not the sole responsibility of individual provinces, but of the whole Society. The SVD generalate may appoint members from any country to any other country with priority given to those places which are most in need. This also explains why many SVD communities are international in character.

The SVD has two sister congregations, also founded by Saint Arnold Janssen. They are the Missionary Sisters Servants of the Holy Spirit (SSpS), otherwise known as the "Blue Sisters" and a  contemplative branch called the Sister Servants of the Holy Spirit of Perpetual Adoration (SSpSAP) or better known as the "Pink Sisters"; the nicknames allude to the colour of the respective religious habits.

Vows

As members of a religious institute the Missionaries of the Divine Word embrace the evangelical counsels, taking the three traditional religious vows of poverty, chastity and obedience. Poverty means that all possessions are held in common and that no member may accumulate wealth. Chastity means more than abstaining from sexual activity and its purpose is to make the religious totally available for service; it is also a sign that only God can completely fill the human heart. For a member of a religious congregation, obedience is not slavishly doing what one is told by the superior but being attentive to God’s will by prayerfully listening to the voice of the person in charge. Ultimately, these vows are lived out within a community and bolstered by a relationship with God.

The core formula of the solemn Vows of the Divine Word Missionaries, as cited in their constitutions, is as follow:″Therefore I, (name), solemnly promise you, Father, Son and Holy Spirit, to live for (x) year / for life of chastity, poverty, and obedience, according to the constitutions of the Society of the Divine Word. I make these vows before you, (Provincial Superior), as the representative of the Superior General and in the presence of this community.″

Religious formation
In the initial stages, those interested in joining the congregation have several meetings with an SVD priest, usually with visits to a community.  During this time the members of the congregation share what it is like to be a  priest, or a religious brother. Those who are enquiring about entering the congregation are strongly encouraged to attend Mass as often as possible, to read the Sacred Scriptures especially the Gospel accounts and to regularly spend time in prayer in order to better discern their vocation.

Pre-novitiate
This is a yearlong experience of living in an SVD community, sharing in many aspects of the life of the congregation. "The goal of the Pre-novitiate is to enable the student to experience religious missionary life in community, deepen his own understanding of vocation and continue the initial learning about the SVD, its charism, its origins, history and mission." During this time the candidates participate in the prayer life of a community, share more deeply with others and become involved in one of more of the congregation’s apostolates. Essentially, it is an extended period of discernment for the postulants and an opportunity for the congregation to assess the strengths of the candidates and possible areas requiring growth.

Novitiate
Next follows the novitiate which is the time for preparing to take the vows of poverty, chastity and obedience.  The novitiate year is crucial, for it is then “…that the novices better understand their divine vocation, and indeed one which is proper to the institute, experience the manner of living of the institute, and form their mind and heart in its spirit, and so that their intention and suitability are tested.” ”The Novitiate provides a special time and environment for the nurturing of a growing vocation; it does not give birth to the vocation. The Novitiate builds upon what is already under way in a person's life. It serves to mature and clarify a vocation in accordance with the religious life style and the special charism of the Society.”

Thus, the novices are given the opportunity for longer periods of prayer and spiritual reading as well as silence in order to reflect on the vocation God is offering and nature of their response. The spiritual development of the novice is of particular focus, especially through spiritual direction. During the novitiate the history and Constitutions of the Congregation are studied in depth. A simple profession is made at the end of the novitiate and the person officially becomes a member of the Society, for “By religious profession, members assume the observance of the three evangelical counsels by public vow, are consecrated to God through the ministry of the Church, and are incorporated into the institute with the rights and duties defined by law.”

Post-novitiate
After the novitiate, the new members of the congregation continue their studies. For those preparing for Holy Orders this normally involves a 4-year theology degree. In the United States  students attend Catholic Theological Union. In Australia, studies are taken at the Melbourne College of Divinity after which students are strongly encouraged to spend a year in a foreign mission before proceeding to ordination. Filipino students attend the Society’s own Divine Word Seminary in Tagaytay. Final vows are taken immediately before ordination to the diaconate which is followed by ordination to the priesthood between six months and a year later.  In Indonesia students attend St. Paul Major Seminary-Ledalero.

Those whose vocation is to the brotherhood pursue studies which are suited to developing their talents and interests. The Society is conscious that some regard brothers as being lower than priests and, in response, it states: “Religious Brothers, by their life and ministry play a prophetic role in the Society and in the Church. They remind us all of the common dignity and fundamental Brotherhood of Christians: "You are all Brothers," (Matthew 23:8.) Furthermore, Brothers keep alive the sense of authentic communion in our communities and our unity in diversity, which is expressed by their being consecrated laymen who live together with clerical confreres. (SVD Constitutions,104)

Missionary work is not tied to ordination. Hence, we should keep in mind that Brothers make a great and equal contribution to mission through their professional work, social services and pastoral ministry. As non-ordained missionaries, brothers are able reach out to the laity, especially to faith-seekers and people of other religious traditions. Together with ordained confreres they bring fullness to the "Missio Dei" in contemporary world.”

Vows are renewed annually; after three years a member may request final vows. According to  Canon law, temporary vows may be renewed for a longer period but not exceeding nine years.

Britain and Ireland 
The Society came to Britain in 1931 and to Ireland in 1939. St. Richards College in Birmingham became its seminary and boarding school. In Ireland Donamon Castle, Co. Roscommon became its noviciate and philosophy school, in 1980 its students moved to Maynooth College. The Divine Word Missions produced the magazine The Word (Divine Word Missionaries) in Maynooth they set up training and media company Kairos Communications which produces programmes for TV, and runs the postgraduate course in conjunction with St. Patrick's College, Maynooth and the media studies degree with National University of Ireland, Maynooth. SVD House provides student accommodation in Maynooth.

Botswana 
In a departure from the traditional sources of income used by many religious congregations which run schools, hospitals and retreat centres, the Divine Word Missionaries who are citizens of Botswana, in collaboration with professional lay people, run "Catholic Safaris". The idea was to run a safari with a Catholic perspective and aims to support the local ventures, creating also job opportunities and income for the families. The centre serves the Catholic mission territory of the northern and western parts of Botswana.

The members of the province also work with those affected by HIV and AIDS, orphaned children, refugees, health education, catechetics, Scripture study, environmental issues and unemployed young people. They have an outreach mission in Zimbabwe. Their preferred partners in dialogue are:"...people who have no faith community and “faith-seekers”

- people who are poor and marginalized

- people of different cultures

- people of different religious traditions and secular ideologies"

Japan
The Society operates Nanzan University in Nagoya, Japan. In 1932 the German SVD missionary Joseph Reiners (1874-1945) founded Nanzan High School in Nagoya. In 1946, the Nanzan College of Foreign Studies was established, which comprised an English Department and Chinese Department, with German and French Departments added in the following year. Nanzan University was formed in 1949.　The Faculty of Literature comprised English, French, German and Chinese Departments. In addition to the schools run by The Society in Japan, many priests serve as pastors in local Churches in Nagoya, Nagasaki, Akita and Niigata Prefectures, and in Tokyo.  The current archbishop of Tokyo, Bishop Tarcisio Isao Kikuchi, and the bishop-elect of the Diocese of Niigata in Northeast Japan, Paul Daisuke Narui, are members of the Society of the Divine Word.

The Philippines
In the Philippines, the Divine Word Missionaries arrived in Bangued, Abra, in 1909, founding schools in Bangued, Vigan, in Ilocos Sur and Laoag City in Ilocos Norte, as well as in other parts of the Philippines. Now there are about 500 Filipino SVD priests and brothers and around 150 of them are serving in overseas missions on all continents. In the Philippines, the SVD have three ecclesiastical provinces, namely: the Philippine North (PHN) that comprises missionary works of Pangasinan to Aparri; the Philippine Central (PHC) that covers the National Capital Region, and all the provinces comprising central Luzon, southern Tagalog and the whole Bicol region; and the Philippine South (PHS) whose ministries cover the Visayas and Mindanao Islands.  Saint Jude Catholic School, a school in Manila near Malacañan Palace, is an SVD school. The congregation opened Christ the King Mission Seminary in 1934 in Quezon City for their Filipino seminarians and from then on their numbers continued to increase eventually making the SVD the largest religious institute of men in the country.

Philippine Southern Province
The SVD Philippine Southern Province works on three areas: formation, education and pastoral ministries.  In formation, young candidates for the priesthood are trained in the Divine Word Formation Center in Davao City while seminarians for brotherhood are formed in the Freinademetz Formation House in Cebu City. In education, the SVDs run the University of San Carlos in Cebu City; Holy Name University in Tagbilaran City; and the Liceo del Verbo Divino (formerly Divine Word University) of Tacloban City. In pastoral ministries, the SVDs have one parish in Cebu City, five parishes in Surigao del Norte, six in Agusan del Sur and two in Zamboanga, Sibugay, and Olutanga Island. They manage radio stations, the Steyler Canteen, Catholic Trade Cebu, Inc., and a retreat house.  They also work in cooperatives, adopted communities, and depressed areas and dialogue with faith seekers and other religions. Their vision statement is as follows: "We, members of the Society of the Divine Word (SVD), an international religious-missionary congregation of brothers and priests, founded by Saint Arnold Janssen and named after the Divine Word, envision a world where dialogue is possible because people, inspired by the Word of God and empowered by the Spirit, respect the uniqueness of each person and accept all nations and peoples."

United States

In 1905 the Divine Word Missionaries began work in African American parishes in Mississippi, and St Augustine Seminary, the first school specifically for the training of African American men for the Catholic priesthood, was opened in Bay St. Louis, Mississippi shortly thereafter.  

Divine Word Missionary priests have long worked in African American communities in Louisiana, Arkansas, and Mississippi, in Chicago, Indianapolis, Los Angeles, and elsewhere.  Numerous African Americans have joined the Society of the Divine Word as priests and brothers and have served as foreign missionaries throughout the world. 

The Western USA Province has since converted the St Augustine's seminary into a retreat center.

Saints
 Arnold Janssen (canonized on 5 October 2003)
 Joseph Freinademetz (canonized on 5 October 2003)

See also

 List of SVD Schools
 Ralph M. Wiltgen

References

Further reading
 Hermann Fischer, Life of Arnold Janssen. Founder of the Society of the Divine Word and the Missionary Congregation of the Servants of the Holy Ghost, translated by Frederic M. Lynk, Mission Press S.V.D.: Techny, Illinois/USA 1925, 520 pp.
 Frederick M. Lynk SVD, Father Arnold Janssen a Modern Pioneer in Missionary Work, Westminster, London: Alexander Ouseley, 1934.
 Heinrich Emmerich SVD, Atlas Societatis Verbi Divini et Congregatio Servarum Spiritus Sancti, Collegium Verbi Divini, Romae 1981.
 Fritz Bornemann,  "Arnold Janssen: Founder of Three Missionary Congregations, 1837-1909: a Biography. Arnoldus Press: 1975
 Fritz Bornemann, A History of the Divine Word Missionaries, (internally: A History of Our Society, Analecta SVD -54-1) Rome 1981, 434 pp.
 Fritz Bornemann, As wine poured out. Blessed Joseph Freinademetz. Missionary in China 1879-1908, Divine Word Missionaries, Rome 1984, 485 pp.
 Society of the Divine Word (SVD)(ed.), SVD Word in the World 1994/95. The Society of the Divine Word (SVD) reports on its world-wide missionary activities. - Divine Word Missionaries: One Hundred Years in North America 1895-1995, Steyler Verlag, Nettetal 1994, 239 pp., .
 Steyler Missionswissenschaftliches Institut (ed.), Divine Word Missionaries in Papua New Guinea, 1896-1996, Festschrift. Steyler Verlag, Nettetal 1996, 231-258, . - also in: Verbum SVD 37:1-2 (1996).
 Society of the Divine Word (SVD), SVD Word in the World 1995-1996 - 100 Years of Service in Papua New Guinea 1896-1996, Steyler Verlag. Nettetal 1996, 176 pp., 
 Society of the Divine Word (SVD), SVD Word in the World 1997-1998. Divine Word Missionaries in Africa and around the World, Steyl/Venlo (Netherlands) - Techny, Ill. (USA) 1997, 167 pp.
 Josef Alt (ed.), Arnold Janssen SVD, Letters to the United States of America, English Edition Translated by Robert Pung SVD, and Peter Spring, Studia Instituti Missiologici SVD 58, Steyler Verl., Nettetal 1998, 552 pp., .
 Divine Word Mission Center (ed.), SVD Word in the World 2001, Techny, Ill. (USA)
 Frank Mihalik, SVD : Readings in PNG Mission History. A chronicle of SVD and SSpS mission involvement on mainland New Guinea between 1946 and 1996, Divine Word University Press, Madang, PNG 1999, 304 pp., .
 Heribert Bettscheider (ed.), Reflecting Mission, Practicing Mission. Divine Word Missionaries Commemorate 125 Years of Worldwide Commitment, Vol. I + II, VVII + 767 pp., Studia Instituti Missiologici SVD 76, Steyler Verlag: Nettetal 2001, .

External links 

 
 Botswana Province
 Portuguese Province
 The Divine Word House (Fátima)
 SVD Argentina - Misioneros del Verbo Divino
 SVD Philippines - Southern Province
 Society of the Divine Word – Irish British Province

 
Religious organizations established in 1875
Catholic religious institutes established in the 19th century
African-American Roman Catholicism